WBBW (1240 AM) is a commercial radio station in Youngstown, Ohio, broadcasting a sports format. The station carries the CBS Sports Radio Network, much of it simulcast with co-owned 96.7 WLLF.

WBBW is one of seven radio stations in the Youngstown market owned by Cumulus Media.  The radio studios and offices are in "The Radio Center" in Youngstown. Prior to January 2, 2013, WBBW featured programming from ESPN Radio.

WBBW carries the Mahoning Valley Scrappers in the collegiate summer baseball league.  WBBW and WLLF are also the Youngstown affiliates of the Cleveland Browns and the Pittsburgh Pirates.

WBBW has been on the air since February 20, 1949.

References

External links

Sports radio stations in the United States
BBW
Radio stations established in 1949
CBS Sports Radio stations
Cumulus Media radio stations
1949 establishments in Ohio